The University of Oklahoma men's basketball team has had 46 players drafted in the National Basketball Association (NBA) while the women's basketball team has had 14 players selected in the Women's National Basketball Association (WNBA). This includes ten players taken in the first round of the NBA Draft and six players in the first round of the WNBA Draft. In 2009, Blake Griffin became the only Oklahoma basketball player to have been selected as the overall number one pick when he was drafted by the Los Angeles Clippers. In the 2010s, nine Oklahoma players have been selected in their respective drafts. Five have been women: three in 2010, one in 2011, and one in 2013. The four men's players drafted in the decade have been Romero Osby in 2013, Buddy Hield and Isaiah Cousins in 2016, and Trae Young in 2018.

Each NBA and WNBA franchise seeks to add new players through their respective annual draft. The NBA uses a draft lottery to determine the first three picks of the NBA draft; the 14 teams that did not make the playoffs the previous year are eligible to participate. After the first three picks are decided, the rest of the teams pick in reverse order of their win–loss record. To be eligible for the NBA Draft, a player in the United States must be at least 19 years old during the calendar year of the draft and must be at least one year removed from the graduation of his high school class. From 1967 until the ABA–NBA merger in 1976, the American Basketball Association (ABA) held its own draft. The WNBA Draft is similar to the NBA with a couple of exceptions. Only four WNBA teams are eligible for the draft lottery, compared to the 14 eligible teams in the NBA. Also, all non-playoff teams that participate in the draft lottery select their picks in the order of the lottery outcome; the remainder of the league selects in reverse order of their win–loss record. The WNBA requires that players be at least 22 years old during the calendar year of the applicable seasons, have either graduated from a four-year university or have completed their intercollegiate basketball eligibility, or have played at least two seasons for another professional basketball league.

Four former Sooner men have been selected to participate in an NBA All-Star Game: Alvan Adams, Mookie Blaylock, Blake Griffin, and Trae Young. Two women, Stacey Dales and Danielle Robinson, have been selected to participate in a WNBA All-Star Game. Three former Sooner men have won championships with their respective teams.

Key

Player selection

NBA Draft

WNBA Draft

Notes

References
General

Specific

Oklahoma Sooners basketball
Oklahoma Sooners
Oklahoma Sooners
Oklahoma Sooners NBA and WNBA drafts